Jack Atkinson (born 23 June 1928) is  a former Australian rules footballer who played with Richmond in the Victorian Football League (VFL).

Notes

External links 

		

Living people
1928 births
Australian rules footballers from Victoria (Australia)
Richmond Football Club players
Redan Football Club players